Saurornitholestinae is a subfamily of the theropod group Dromaeosauridae. The saurornitholestines currently include three monotypic genera: Atrociraptor marshalli, Bambiraptor feinbergi, and Saurornitholestes langstoni. All are medium-sized dromaeosaurs from the Late Cretaceous of western North America. The group was originally recognized by Longrich and Currie as the sister taxon to a clade formed by the Dromaeosaurinae and Velociraptorinae. However, not all phylogenetic analyses recover this group and/or with the same proposed genera.

Classification
Below are the results for the Eudromaeosauria phylogeny based on the phylogenetic analysis conducted by Jasinski and colleagues in 2020 during the description of Dineobellator. The group was recovered, but this time with the exclusion of Bambiraptor:

See also

 Timeline of dromaeosaurid research

References

Eudromaeosaurs
Fossil taxa described in 2009